Crachefeu was a French Navy gun brig launched in 1793. Sir Richard Strachan's squadron captured her in 1795 in Cartaret Bay, and the Royal Navy took her into service as HMS Crachefeu. She then sailed to the West Indies where she broken up in 1797, or possibly around 1802.

French Navy
From 22 March 1794 to 8 December, Crachefeu was under the command of enseigne de vaisseau non entretenu Menage.

Then from 30 December to 29 April 1795, still under Menage's command, she escorted a convoy from Granville to Carteret, cruised in the vicinity of Chausey, and took up station at Regnéville-sur-Mer.

Capture

British account
The British squadron spotted a convoy of 13 vessels and immediately gave chase. Twelve of the quarry escaped and got close to the shore where a small shore battery, their own armed escorts, and a brig and a lugger offered some protection. Strachan sent in the boats from the vessels in his squadron while Melampus and the ships provided covering fire. The French crews abandoned their vessels at the approach of the British and eventually the shore battery also stopped firing. The cutting out party retrieved all the vessels, save a small sloop, which was hard ashore and which they burnt. Melampus had eight men wounded and in all the British lost one man killed and 14 wounded. They captured a gun brig and a gun lugger, each armed with three 18-pounder guns. They also captured the convoy, which consisted of: Prosperitte (80 tons and carrying cordage), Montagne (200 tons and carrying timber, lead and tin plates), Catharine (200 tons and carrying ship timber), Hyrondelle (220 tons and carrying ship timber and pitch), Contente (250 tons, carrying powder), Nymphe (120 tons carrying fire wood), Bonne-Union (150 tons), Fantazie (45 tons carrying coals), Alexandre (397 and carrying ship timber, cordage, hemp and cannon), and Petit Neptune (113 tons and carrying ship timber). A later prize money report add the names of two more vessels, Crachefeu and Eclair. Crachefeu was the gun-brig and Eclair the gun-lugger, and the Royal Navy took both into service.

French account
The convoy left for Cherbourg at 9:15pm, and at 3:30 sighted five English vessels. The convoy tried to reach Carteret, but  was forced to take shelter at Surtainville, where there was a fort. The convoy reached the fort by 7:15. There her crew attempted to scuttle Crachefeu, but were only able to run her ashore. All the crew got ashore safely around 9:30, including her officers and her commander, Ménage. They continued to resist from shore with small arms fire, but the British were able to retrieve all the vessels. Two Frenchmen, one a customs official and one a farmer, were killed assisting the guns of the fort, which amounted to three 24-pounders, one of which was dismounted during the action.

Royal Navy
On 17 December Crachefeu came into Milford. She had carried away her rudder head and to get back into port the crew had to tie one of her sweeps to the after part of her rudder and use tackles to move it.

On 12 April 1796 he sailed her to the Leeward Islands. Crachefeu sailed for the Leeward Islands on the same day as Eclair, and so possibly in company with her.

Fate
Some sources state that Crachefeu was broken up in 1797.

Crachefeu may not have been broken up in 1797, however. Admiralty records hold a letter dated 4 February 1802 that states that "The Crachefeu, formally a gun vessel which was used for many years about moorings and anchors in Martinique, has been frequently sunk and is riddled with worms. Rear Admiral Sir John Duckworth has given orders that she be destroyed."

Citations

References
 Fonds Marine. Campagnes (opérations; divisions et stations navales; missions diverses). Inventaire de la sous-série Marine BB4. Tome premier : BB4 1 à 209 (1790-1804)

External links
 

1794 ships
Brigs of the French Navy
Captured ships
Brigs of the Royal Navy